Juan Martín Aranguren (born 10 July 1983) is a retired Argentine professional tennis player who played primarily ITF and Challengers events.

Aranguren made his ATP Tour debut at the 2006 Romanian Open in Bucharest, when he successfully advanced through three qualifying rounds to reach the main draw. He defeated Sergiy Stakhovsky 6–4, 3–6, 7–5, Laurentiu-Antoniu Erlic 6–0, 6–3 and Adrian Ungur 7–6(7–5), 6–4 before being eliminated by second seed and eventual semi-finalist Florent Serra 1–6, 0–6 in the first round. The following year at the 2007 Romanian Open he received a wild card entry into the doubles main draw, alongside compatriot Gustavo Marcaccio where they were defeated in the first round by Sergio Roitman and Filippo Volandri 2–6, 4–6. He would go on to receive entry into the 2008 Buenos Aires Open main draw as an alternate pair, alongside another compatriot Diego Junqueira but again lost in the first round this time to Peter Luczak and Werner Eschauer in a three setter 6–4, 3–6, 13–15.

His next and final ATP main draw appearance wouldn't come until four years later in singles where he would qualify for the 2010 Chile Open in similar fashion. He defeated Federico Delbonis 7–6(7–3), 5–7, 6–1 Gastón Gaudio 3–6, 6–3, 6–1, and Boris Pašanski 6–3, 6–1 before losing in the first round to fellow qualifier David Marrero in three tight sets 6–7(4–7), 6–2, 6–7(2–7).

ATP Challenger and ITF Futures finals

Singles: 21 (11–10)

Doubles: 32 (15–17)

References

External links
 
 

1983 births
Living people
Argentine male tennis players
Tennis players from Buenos Aires
Tennis players at the 2007 Pan American Games
Pan American Games competitors for Argentina
21st-century Argentine people